The 1992 ITU Triathlon World Cup was a series of triathlon races organised by the International Triathlon Union (ITU) for elite-level triathletes. There were ten races held in ten countries, each held over a distance of 1500 m swim, 40 km cycle, 10 km run (an Olympic-distance triathlon).

Results

San Andrés, Colombia 
 10 May 1992 (US$ 20,000)

Säter, Sweden 
 28 June 1992 (US$ 20,000)

Portaferry, Ireland 
 4 July 1992 (US$ 20,000)

Moscow, Russia 
 12 July 1992 (US$ 20,000)

Embrun, France 
 15 August 1992 (US$ 20,000)

Beijing, China 
 29 August 1992 (US$ 20,000)

Las Vegas, United States 
 26 September 1992 (US$ 20,000)

Monte Carlo, Monaco 
 25 October 1992 (US$ 32,000)

Salvador, Brazil 
 31 October 1992 (US$ 20,000)

Ixtapa, Mexico 
 8 November 1992 (US$ 20,000)

Final ranking

See also 
 1992 ITU Triathlon World Championships

References 
 Results

ITU Triathlon World Cup
World Cup